Tughlaq Road (Hindi: तुग़लक़ मार्ग, Urdu: تغلق مارگ  Tughlaq Mārg) is one of the main roads of Central New Delhi

North End
The north end of this road is at the traffic circle at the junction of Krishna Menon Road, Akbar Road (east and west sides) and Tees January Marg.

South end
The south end of this road is at the junction of Safdarjung Road, Prithviraj Road and Sri Aurobindo Marg, near Safdarjung's Tomb in Delhi.

Junctions
This road is intersected by Dr. A.P.J.Abdul Kalaam Road and the Tughlaq Crescent
near the Tugluk Road police station.

 

Roads in Delhi
Streets in New Delhi